Earl Lloyd Moore (March 14, 1898 - August 12, 1979) was an American model railroader who published over a hundred pieces in various American model railroading magazines between 1955 and 1980 under the name E. L. Moore. His articles dealt primarily with scratch-building HO scale structures from low-cost, simple materials, primarily balsa wood. Moore prided himself on being able to construct complex models in little time for little money. He often noted that his projects could be built for a couple of dollars worth of materials in a couple of weeks of evenings. Moore undertook this work while a resident of Charlotte, North Carolina.

Moore concentrated on depicting the buildings and life of rural America in the 1890s and early 1900s - the period around his boyhood - in accordance with his personal view on the era. Moore's articles are notable both for their subject matter as well as their style. Along with the model under discussion, Moore would write the text, shoot and develop the photographs, and draft the plans. The accompanying photographs would often include one or more detailed staged scenes depicting everyday life with the building, and the text often wove in a humorous fictional story about the building and its inhabitants. He did not concentrate on modeling particular real railroads as is the norm for model railroad hobbyists, but focused on modeling buildings of both railroad and non-railroad subjects, as well as scenery.

Pre-model railroading biography

Early life 
Moore was born and raised on a farm in rural southern Michigan. The farm's exact location is unknown, but in Moore's biographical piece called Early Century Field day he noted it was within a 9-mile radius of Bangor, Michigan, about 2 miles from a two-room school he attended as a boy, and there was a windmill and water tank about 2 1/2 miles away where one could board a Chicago bound 'flyer' while its locomotive stopped to take on water.

His father was the school treasurer, and on the first of each month one of Moore's chores was to deliver the teacher's paycheck. Treasurers were known to handle money, and one night Moore's father was held up at gunpoint and forced to open the safe in his parents' bedroom. The robbers made their escape by breaking open a nearby railroad section house and stealing the handcar. The next day the handcar was found abandoned down the line about a dozen miles away.

Moore served in the United States Navy on the USS Georgia in 1917 and 1918 during World War I. He was an honorary chaplain of the Veterans of Foreign Wars.

Little is known about Moore from the time he left the Navy until he arrived in Charlotte, where he set up a photography studio specializing in baby and child portraits. The few factoids that are known about Moore's life prior to his emergence on the national scene as a model railroader include: working in a paper mill in the northeast; working as a furniture salesman; and, during the 1930s, living as a self-described vagabond.

Photography studio 
Moore was a photographer, and starting sometime in the late 1930s or early to mid 1940s he ran a photography studio in Charlotte that specialized in baby and child portraiture. Over the years it operated from several locations. It burned down sometime between the mid-1950s and mid-1960s. Moore then retired from business and devoted himself to model railroading.

Model railroad publications 
Moore's model railroading activities were intertwined with his work as a freelance contributor to various US model railroading magazines. His work appeared in Model Railroader, Railroad Model Craftsman, Model Trains and Railroad Modeler. Moore's publications can be divided into three distinct periods.

Period 1: February 1955 to March 1962 
The first period ran from February 1955, when his first publication appeared in Model Railroader, until March 1962, when his article on how to build an HO scale model of Disney's Grizzly Flats depot was the cover story of the final regular issue of Model Trains. During this time he established himself as an author capable of writing on a range of model railroading related construction projects that included structure building, rolling stock construction, scenery, lighting and scene staging.

Period 2: June 1962 to October 1970 
The second period ran from June 1962 to October 1970. This era saw Moore develop and solidify what would become his signature style: HO scale building construction projects that could be undertaken for about $2 or $3 in materials, require a couple of weeks of spare time to complete and be suitable for a wide variety of layouts all woven into a how-to article complete with scenic photos of the finished project and a humorous fictional story. This period ended with a 13-month stretch, starting in November 1970, where he had no articles published.

Period 3: December 1971 to July 1980 
The third period ran from his first Railroad Modeler article in December 1971 until his death in August 1979. His last article appeared in the July 1980 issue of Railroad Model Craftsman. One of his more infamous projects, The Cannonball and Safety Powder Works, which concluded by blowing up the finished model and photographing the HO scale conflagration, was published in this period and was featured in the April 1977 issue of Model Railroader. At the end of this period some of his boyhood reminisces were published in Good Old Days magazine.

Books 
Samples of Moore's work appeared in books published by Kalmbach Publishing Co..

Unpublished Manuscripts 
In 1980, Model Railroader'''s editor, Jim Kelly, noted the magazine was in possession of 6 unpublished manuscripts by Moore and had an intention of publishing them. They were never published, but did surface in 2016. 

Also in 2016 a collection of previously unknown and unpublished manuscripts were found among Moore's papers. 

 Story characters 
His construction articles and photo essays often wove in a humorous fictional story about the structure and its inhabitants. This set his work apart from the more usual form of construction article presentation that focused mainly on materials and how-to instructions. Moore's characters were often cast as members of his extended family; how much they were based on actual family members is unknown.

Fictional characters that have appeared in Moore's stories include: Cousin Caleb, Uncle Wilber, Mr. P. Pottle, Great grandfather Lucifer Penroddy Snooks, Waldo Hoople, Cousin Rube, Grandfather Pudzi, Uncle Peabody, Uncle Dinwoody, Cousin Elmer (Dinwoody), Pistachio Jr., Ma Spumoni, Cousin Leroy, Uncle Sim, Grandpa Bunn, and Uncle Charley Spumoni.

Moore had a large personal library and was a voracious reader. The influences of written material on Moore's projects and stories include the works of: Charles 'Chic' Sale, Rowland Emett, Dorothy Parker, Carl Fallberg, Bill Schopp, H. Allen Smith, Lucius Beebe & Charles Clegg, Charles E. Carryl, Richard Armour, George Allen and Robert B. Nixon, Jr.

Moore would sometimes appear in his stories as himself, the project's builder. In his photos of HO scale scenes he would sometimes appear in the guise of his avatar: an HO scale old time photographer hunched behind his tripod mounted view camera cloaked in a horse blanket style focusing hood.

 Outhouses 
Inspired by Charles 'Chic' Sale's fictional character Lem Putt, a carpenter specializing in outhouse construction, Moore built a number of HO scale outhouses of various designs that he mounted on small squares of card, signed on the bottom and gave to friends as gifts. Moore considered himself a master of outhouse modeling and eighteen of his creations were presented in his article A Mighty Relaxin' Job that appeared in the November 1975 issue of the NMRA Bulletin.

 Television appearance 
In early July 1971, a camera crew from the television show Carolina Camera, produced by WBTV in Charlotte, North Carolina, shot a segment on Moore and his model railroad work at his apartment. It is not known if it aired. Moore did not own a television.

 Model construction techniques 

Although Moore used a variety of techniques and materials to build HO scale structures, he was known for using certain construction methods again-and-again. They formed a suite of techniques for keeping his projects easy and low-cost. Moore's article, Bunn's feed and seed, that appeared in the August 1973 issue of Model Railroader, is an example project that makes use of most of his standard construction techniques.

 Balsa wood 
Balsa was Moore's preferred material for all aspects of construction from wall and roof substrates to the load bearing members of bridges and trestles. It was a soft and easy material to work, but also strong, lightweight, inexpensive and readily available as it was also a primary airframe building material for model airplane hobbyists.

 Shingles & siding with a wood burning tool 
One of his earliest articles, Burn those models, that appeared in the May 1955 issue of Railroad Model Craftsman, and Modeling with a burning tool, that appeared in the July 1962 issue of Model Railroader, outlined his technique for using a woodburning tool to score shingle, brick, stone and siding patterns into balsa instead of purchasing equivalent commercial materials.

 Paper metal 
If a building called for corrugated metal siding, Moore would make his own by taping a piece of 20-pound bond paper over a piece of Northeastern brand .040” spaced corrugated board and then scribing the corrugations into the paper with a spent ball point pen. To make metal roofing, he would score only along every third groove. When finished, the paper was cut into suitably sized scale panels.

 Paper pipes 
His buildings often needed overhead and rooftop piping, which he would make by first rounding off some balsa strips whose cross section was close to that required, and then finishing the circular profile by forcing the strips through holes of the desired diameter. He would complete the job by wrapping the now cylindrical balsa strips in paper.

 Inked window sashes & mullions 
Moore rarely used commercial window castings, but would make his own windows by rubbing a piece of clear acetate with an abrasive like pumice, talc or kitchen cleanser and then drawing in the mullions and sashes with a ruling pen and straightedge.

 Selective compression 
Many real life buildings suitable for use on a model railroad can take up an inordinate amount of space on a layout in relation to its other elements; especially so in Moore's era when many HO scale model railroads were built on standard 4' x 8' sheets of plywood. Selective Compression is a technique used to remove redundant visual and spatial elements from a building and distill it down in size to just the features that make it unique and useful on a model railroad. The resulting model is then proportioned more consistently with a layout's other elements and spacings. Many of Moore's projects were sized or selectively compressed to fit within a 1 square foot area. Moore's selective compressions were not without controversy. A letter to the editor in the August 1974 issue of Railroad Model Craftsman noted that Moore's paper mill that appeared in the April 1974 issue was rather unrealistic because it had only a 7" x 8" footprint and actual paper mills were far more massive

 The dot & blot method of time recording 
Moore often boasted that many of his projects only took about two weeks of spare time to build. He developed a tongue-in-cheek method of keeping track of time, outlined in his article Ceresota flour mill that appeared in the November 1976 issue of Model Railroader. On a calendar he would mark a dot for each hour worked, half a dot for a half hour, and a blot for anything thing that seemed like 3 hours. To get the time it took to build a project, he would add up the dots and blots, and add a few extras in for good measure.

 Layouts & dioramas 
Traditionally, model railroaders are defined by their layouts. Moore built 5 layouts and dioramas. There was a 6th layout: Gordon Odegard noted that Moore's very first layout was a 4' x 6' Lionel O27 based setup, but no details are known.

 The Rowland Emett tribute diorama 
An HO scale diorama featuring trains, trams, buildings and scenes made famous by a number of Rowland Emett cartoons. It is thought to have been built sometime in the early to mid 1950s. Its first appearance was in the photo essay with the Spumoni family in Merrie Old England that appeared in the January 1956 issue of Railroad Model Craftsman.

 The Elizabeth Valley Railroad 
A 4' x 6' HO scale layout based in a mountainous region surrounding a valley with a lake and stream.  Set in an unspecified US location sometime in the late 1890s or early 1900s. The layout was named for his daughter and is thought to have been built in the early to mid 1950s. Its first appearance was in a photo that appeared in the February 1955 issue of Model Railroader as part of that magazine's Trackside Photos section. The Elizabeth Valley RR was Moore's most significant layout. A number of buildings that appeared on it were described in several construction articles, and it also served as the stage for articles on lighting, scenery and rolling stock construction.

 The Eagleroost & Koontree Railroad 
A collection of temporary scenes built for photographing models featuring a fictitious narrow gauge mountain railroad located in an unspecified US location, situated sometime in the late 1890s or early 1900s. It was modeled in HOn2-1/2 gauge. Some of the scenes were staged on The Elizabeth Valley Railroad. Its first print appearance was in the Fall 1957 issue of Model Trains as part of that issue's Stop, look and listen photo section. The 1900s Shortline Terminal Yard 
An HO scale diorama of a backwoods, shortline terminal yard situated sometime around 1900 and was stylistically similar to the Elizabeth Valley Railroad. It was built during the winter of 1964 and 1965, and into the spring of 1965. Its print appearance was in Turn backward, O Time that was published in the January 1967 issue of Model Railroader. The yard's engine house was featured in Model Railroaders March 1967 article Brick Enginehouse.

 The Enskale & Hoentee Railroad 
A 30” x 30” layout situated in a mountainous region surrounding a lake. Set in an unspecified US location sometime in the late 1890s or early 1900s. It included buildings in N and TT scales, and ran trains in N and HOn2-1/2 gauge. It was built as a project layout for Railroad Model Craftsman. When Model Railroader'''s editorial staff learned that Moore was working in N scale, they offered him a deal to write a book for beginners starting out in N scale, similar to their book HO Primer. Moore declined the offer stating that he felt he was not skilled enough in electrical matters to write about a typical layout's complex electrical system and that he did not like working to deadlines. The layout was built during the winter of 1967 and 1968, and into the spring 1968. It appeared in print in a three part series in the October, November and December 1968 issues of Railroad Model Craftsman.

 Plastic model kits 
Beginning in 1967, AHM (Associated Hobby Manufacturers) of Philadelphia produced the first of 9 HO scale plastic model kits, the Schaefer Brewery, based on a selection of Moore' s Railroad Model Craftsman articles.

The kit boxes were stamped with a decorative label that read: "Designed by E. L. Moore. Reproduced by permission from plans as shown in Railroad Model Craftsman Magazine." It is alleged that Moore received no payment or royalty for these kits, but was given a few as a gesture of appreciation.

Although the molds changed ownership over the years, some of the kits, like Ma's Place, have remained in production since their first release and remain in production as of 2017. As well, the components of some kits have been used for other commercially available plastic model kits, and in recent years, some of Moore's articles have been used as the basis of a number of commercially available craftsman-style kits.

 Death and retrospective 
Moore died on August 12, 1979, in Spotsylvania County, Virginia, of a heart attack caused by arteriosclerosis. His remains were cremated.

In November 1979, Railroad Model Craftsmans editor Anthony Koester published a brief tribute to Moore in the Editor's Notebook column. In February 1980, Jim Kelly, editor of Model Railroader, wrote a 5-page tribute to Moore in E. L. Moore's Legacy. As well as providing a tribute to Moore's life and work, it showed for the first time a number of then never published before color photographs of several of Moore's projects. In 1999, Model Railroader noted in its Along the Line Looks Back series that E. L. Moore was a notable model railroader for his use of simple materials to build unique model structures.

References 

Rail transport modellers
1898 births
1979 deaths